Laura Arrillaga-Andreessen (born 1969/1970) is an American philanthropist, educator and author.

She is the founder and president of the Laura Arrillaga-Andreessen Foundation, a private operating foundation that describes itself as a philanthropic "innovation lab", and founded the Silicon Valley Social Venture Fund (SV2), a venture philanthropy fund. She is also the author of Giving 2.0: Transform Your Giving and Our World.

Personal life 
Arrillaga-Andreessen was born in Palo Alto, California, the daughter of Frances C. Arrillaga and billionaire real estate developer John Arrillaga, Sr. She received a BA (1992) and MA (1999) in Art History from Stanford University, an MA (1998) in Education from Stanford School of Education, and an MBA (1997) from the Stanford Graduate School of Business.

Arrillaga-Andreessen has said her mother's volunteer work was a strong influence on her when she was growing up in Palo Alto. She became active in philanthropy after her mother's early death from cancer. Arrillaga-Andreessen married Marc Andreessen in 2006. The couple have one son. Arrillaga-Andreessen and her husband co-founded the Marc and Laura Andreessen Foundation. Arrillaga-Andreessen is the Foundation's president.

In 2022, Arrillaga-Andreessen and her husband advocated against the construction of 131 multifamily housing units in their affluent Atherton, California town.

Career 
While attending the Stanford Graduate School of Business, Arrillaga-Andreessen developed a business plan for an organization to teach philanthropy and make grants based on venture capital firm investment strategies. The organization became the Silicon Valley Social Venture Fund (SV2), which Arrillaga-Andreessen founded in 1998 and served as its chairman until 2008; she is currently its chairman emeritus.

In 2006, she founded and serves as board chairman of Stanford PACS (Center on Philanthropy and Civil Society), a social change research center.  She has been an Instructor at the Stanford Graduate School of Business since 2000 and teaches courses on philanthropy and on leadership.

In 2011, Arrillaga-Andreessen's book Giving 2.0: Transform Your Giving and Our World was published by Jossey-Bass, and she writes about philanthropy for The Huffington Post and other publications.

Honors 
In 2001, Arrillaga-Andreessen received the Jacqueline Kennedy Award for Women in Leadership and in April 2005 became a Henry Crown Fellow of the Aspen Institute. She was awarded the President's Volunteer Service Award from the Points of Light Foundation in June 2005 and Children and Family Services' Outstanding Silicon Valley Philanthropist Award in 2009. In 2011, she and Marc Andreessen received Global Citizen Awards from the Global Philanthropy Forum of the World Affairs Councils of America.

References 

American humanitarians
Women humanitarians
American nonprofit businesspeople
21st-century American businesswomen
21st-century American businesspeople
American people of Basque descent
Stanford Graduate School of Business alumni
Silicon Valley people
Living people
Year of birth missing (living people)
Writers from Palo Alto, California
Stanford University Graduate School of Business faculty
Stanford Graduate School of Education alumni
Activists from California
American women philanthropists
Henry Crown Fellows
Arrillaga family
Hispanic and Latino American educators
21st-century American philanthropists